Francisco Pagazaurtundua González-Murrieta (22 October 1894 – 18 November 1958), better known as Pagaza, was a Spanish footballer who played as a forward. He was a member of the Spanish team that won the silver medal in the 1920 Summer Olympics as well as a Copa del Rey winner with Arenas Club de Getxo.

Club career 
Born in Santurtzi to an architect and a piano teacher, Pagaza began playing football at Colegio Orduña and during his time as a student in England. He began his career with Arenas Club in 1912, where he stood as a phenomenal winger, so he was signed by Athletic Club de Madrid in 1916. After two years he returned to Arenas in 1918, where he played a pivotal role in helping the club win the Biscay Championship and the Copa del Rey in 1919, starting in the final as Arenas defeated the powerful FC Barcelona 5-2. At that time living exclusively out of football wasn't easy, and therefore he had a second job, working in the harbor of Santander, which is why he signed for Real Racing Club de Santander in 1920. He also spent a season at Gimnástica de Torrelavega and Racing Club de Madrid, finishing his career with the latter in 1928.

International career 
Being an Arenas Club player, he was eligible to play for the Biscay representative team, and he was one of the eleven footballers that played in the team's first-ever game on 13 December 1914 against fellow Basques Gipuzkoa, held at San Mamés, and Pagaza scored the winning goal in a 2-1 victory. During this time he was also summoned to play for the Norte team, a side consisting of Basque players including Cantabria, but usually featured only players from the Basque provinces of Biscay and Gipuzkoa, each of which also organized their own representative matches occasionally such as the one mentioned before. Pagaza was one of the eleven footballers that played in Norte's first-ever game on 3 January 1915 against Catalonia, and once again he scored in a 6-3 win.

In May of 1915, he was selected to represent the Norte team in the first edition of the Prince of Asturias Cup, an inter-regional competition organized by the RFEF. He played both games as the Basque team secured the first-ever trophy of the competition with a win over Catalonia and a draw with the Centro team (a Castile/Madrid XI).

He also represented Spain in the nation's international debut at the 1920 Summer Olympics, being one of the eleven footballers who participated in Spain's first-ever victory (1-0) over Denmark on 28 August 1920. He featured in all of Spain's first four internationals at the Summer Olympics, but missed the decisive game against the Netherlands, which saw Spain win 3-1 to win the silver medal. In total, he earned seven caps for Spain, four at the 1920 Olympics and three in friendlies, the last of which was on 17 December 1922 at Estádio do Lumiar in Lisbon in a 2-1 win over Portugal.

When he joined Racing de Santander, he become eligible to play for the Cantabria representative team, and he was one of the eleven footballers that played in the team's first-ever game on 9 March 1924, but this time he failed to score in a 3–0 win over Aragon. This means he was a member of the first-ever line-ups of four different teams, Biscay, Norte (Basque Country), Cantabria and Spain, which is probably an unmatched feat.

As a manager 
After his retirement as a player, he began a career as a coach. He coached Racing de Santander thrice, as well as the likes of Osasuna (1930-1931), Real Sporting de Gijón (1933-1934), Mallorca (1939-1941), Hércules CF (1944-1945) and Elche CF (1945-1946).

Honours

Club
Arenas Club
Biscay Championship
Winners (1): 1918–19

Copa del Rey
Champions (1): 1919

Racing de Santander
Cantabrian Championship
Champions (4): 1922–23, 1924–25, 1925–26 and 1926–27

International
Spain
Summer Olympics:
Silver medal (1): 1920

Basque Country
Prince of Asturias Cup:
Champions (1) 1915

References

External links
 

1894 births
1958 deaths
Spanish footballers
Spain international footballers
Footballers at the 1920 Summer Olympics
Olympic footballers of Spain
Olympic silver medalists for Spain
Arenas Club de Getxo footballers
Atlético Madrid footballers
Racing de Santander players
Footballers from the Basque Country (autonomous community)
Spanish football managers
Racing de Santander managers
CA Osasuna managers
RCD Mallorca managers
Hércules CF managers
Elche CF managers
Olympic medalists in football
Medalists at the 1920 Summer Olympics
Association football forwards
Basque Country international footballers
Sportspeople from Biscay
People from Santurtzi